This list contains the names of albums that contain a hidden track and also information on how to find them. Not all printings of an album contain the same track arrangements, so some copies of a particular album may not have the hidden track(s) listed below. Some of these tracks may be hidden in the pregap, and some hidden simply as a track following the listed tracks. The list is ordered by artist name using the surname where appropriate.

 The Eagles, Eagles Greatest Hits, Vol. 2: Immediately following the final song "After The Thrill Is Gone" there is a studio outtake with a lot of piano playing. This was later heard at the end of Disc Two on Selected Works: 1972–1999
 Earl Brutus, Your Majesty… We Are Here: At the end of Track 13 (Karl Brutus) there is a long pause before the hidden track "Single Seater Xmas"
 Econoline Crush, The Devil You Know: Tracks 12 through 22 of the album are silent; track 23 consists of I Corinthians 13:4-8 recited in Japanese.
 Eels, Daisies of the Galaxy: "Mr E's Beautiful Blues" at the end of the album. Although not on the track-listing, later versions of the album featured a sticker advertising it as a 'bonus track'.
 Elastic No-No Band, Fustercluck!!!: After 110 seconds of silence after the last track on disc 1, Muzak-style version of the songs "My 3 Addictions" and "Cheese Fries," from the band's previous album My 3 Addictions, play.
 Elastic No-No Band, No-No's (Leftovers and Live Songs): Tracks 13 through 15 are each full songs that are unlisted on the CD.
 Eldritch, El Niño: "Nebula Surface" following the last listed track, "El Niño"
 The Electrics, Livin' It Up When I Die: nonsense looping at 3:36 in the last track, "Face"
 Eleventyseven, Galactic Conquest: "Program Terminated" starts with a few seconds of sound and is followed by a blank space, and then more music.
 Sophie Ellis-Bextor, Shoot from the Hip (2003): Song titled "Physical" starts in about minute from the time previous ends. It's a cover of Olivia Newton-John's song.
 Emery, The Question: There is a hidden track after the final track "In A Win, Win Situation"
 EMF, Schubert Dip: "EMF," the song, is hidden in the album.
 Eminem:
 Relapse: Ken Kaniff (Skit) begins immediately after the track "Underground".
 Recovery: There is a hidden track, named Untitled, after the final track, "You're Never Over".
 The Marshall Mathers LP 2: Ken Kaniff (Skit) begins after the track "Wicked Way".
 Emmure, Speaker of the Dead: After the song "Word of Intulo" ("Word of Intulo" ends on 0:39 seconds) starts a strange noises.
 The Enemy, Music for the People: An unnamed track at the end of the track "Silver Spoon," around 5 minutes of silence after the titled song ends.
 Ensemble Modern, Ensemble Modern Plays Frank Zappa: Greggery Peccary & Other Persuasions: After 28 seconds of the last track ("Greggery Peccary") there's "Does This Kind of Life Looks Interesting To You," another Frank Zappa cover. Interesting enough that track was listed on the ads for the album when it came out.
 Enter The Haggis, "Let The Wind Blow High": "Honeydew Melons" is a hidden track after the final track, "The Mexican Scotsman"
 Enter Shikari, The Zone: Two Tracks, "Return To Energizer" and "Keep It on Ice," come after about ten seconds of silence on the last song.
 Enya, Shepherd Moons: A sample of "Marble Halls" can be heard in the opening seconds of "Evacuee"
 Willy Epson, The Hektapes: The final track, "Cold as Mics," contains a brief reprise lasting about ten seconds after a gap of 1:11, followed by a short pause of about two seconds and a further reprise lasting about two seconds, then finally cuts out.
 Erasure, Rain: Plus: A vocal mix of "First Contact" at the end of the maxi-single
 Eternal's last album Eternal has a hidden track after the last track.
 Evanescence, Fallen: Only available on later versions of the album, the band version of "My Immortal" which was also featured in the music video.
 Origin: Rewind the intro which reveals a humorous edit of "Anywhere."
 The Sound Asleep EP song "Ascension of the Spirit" includes 3:16 of orchestra, :10 seconds of a musical interlude, :07 of movie quotes (My Boyfriend's back) and eight minutes of silence.
 Anywhere but Home has a hidden track, a "Bring Me to Life" performance.
 Evanescence EP: turn up the volume when listening to the last track (titled "The End") to hear the ending of "Solitude".
 Eve's Plum, Envy: A short acoustic version of the song "Envy" starts after "Kiss Your Feet," although on vinyl this is a full band version is available on vinyl
 Everclear, So Much for the Afterglow: "Hating You For Christmas" following the final track.
 Slow Motion Daydream: "White Noise" appears as track 12, and begins playing after one minute of silence.
 Welcome to the Drama Club: "Beautiful Dream" follows the final track.
 Everything but the Girl, Amplified Heart: "Missing (Todd Terry Remix)" appears as track 11 but is not listed on the album.
 Evinrudes: The Evinrudes: The band's self-titled album contains a hidden track at the end of the final song, "Indians on the Moon." The song ends at 5:35 and then there is 4 minutes of silence when the song picks back up again at approximately 9:35 as an acoustic version of the same song. The song ends at 14:57.
 eXterio: Le Délire du Savant Fou: "Berger Allemand" (German Shepherd Dog) at the end of the album.
 Extreme, Waiting for the Punchline: On some early presses of the album there were only 11 tracks with "Fair Weather Faith" omitted entirely and the title track beginning at the 5:30-point of track 11.
 Exit-13, Smoking Songs: There is a hidden track called "Loading Dock" appears at 13:00 after the final track.
 Exit Tunes Presents, Vocalonexus feat. Hatsune Miku: The featured Vocaloids have a heated argument after the final track "Mata Aishita."
 Exodus: The Atrocity Exhibition... Exhibit A At 18:08, on the song "Bedlam 1-2-3," A country version of Bonded By Blood, called "Bonded by Banjo" or "Banjoed by Blood"
 Ezio, The Making of Mr. Spoons: A hidden track, "The further we stretch," appears after more than 17 minutes of silence at the end of track 11, "My friend tonight (darkness)."

See also
 List of backmasked messages
 List of albums with tracks hidden in the pregap

References 

E